Yugoslav Muslim People's Organization was a Bosniak political party in the Kingdom of Serbs, Croats and Slovenes. It was founded in 1922 by initiative of the Serbian governing parties, substituting the Yugoslav Muslim Organization as their Bosnian ally. JMNO did however fail to overtake the leading role amongst Bosnian Muslims from JMO.

References

Bosniak political parties
Islamic political parties
Political parties established in 1922
Political parties in the Kingdom of Yugoslavia
Islam in Yugoslavia
Ethnic organizations based in Yugoslavia
Bosniak history
Yugoslav Bosnia and Herzegovina